Don Mills is a former American college basketball player. He is best known as a key reserve on the University of Kentucky's 1958 NCAA championship team.

College career
Mills was recruited to play basketball at the University of Kentucky by head coach Adolph Rupp following an All-American season at Berea Community High School. As a sophomore (the first season he was eligible to play), Mills was the first player off the bench for the  "Fiddlin' Five" during the 1957-58 season. He played a significant role in the 1958 Championship Game against Seattle after starting center Ed Beck was sidelined due to foul trouble. Mills scored nine points off the bench, including a hook shot over Seattle's Elgin Baylor with 5:50 minutes left in the second half to give Kentucky the lead.

Mills became the Wildcats' starting center the following season. As a senior, he averaged 12.8 points and 12.9 rebounds per game and was named second team All-Southeastern Conference (SEC) by the Associated Press and first team All-SEC by the conference's coaches. He finished his collegiate career with 699 rebounds (9.4 per game) and 664 points (9.4 per game) in 71 total games played.

Post-Kentucky
Mills was selected in the 18th round (92nd overall) by the Syracuse Nationals in the 1960 NBA draft but never played in an NBA game.

References

External links
BigBlueHistory.net profile

Living people
American men's basketball players
Basketball players from Kentucky
Centers (basketball)
Kentucky Wildcats men's basketball players
People from Berea, Kentucky
Syracuse Nationals draft picks
Year of birth missing (living people)